The 1989 St. Louis mayoral election was held on April 4, 1989 to elect the mayor of St. Louis, Missouri. It saw the re-election of Vincent C. Schoemehl to a third term.

The election was preceded by party primaries on March 7.

Democratic primary

General election

References

Mayoral elections in St. Louis
St. Louis
1989 in Missouri